Woe, Is Me is an American metalcore band from Atlanta, Georgia. Formed in 2009, the band is signed to Rise Records and its subsidiary, Velocity Records. Their debut album, Numbers, was released on August 31, 2010, and charted at number 16 on Billboards Top Heatseekers chart. Due to perpetual conflicts within the lineup the band suffered several lineup changes during its four-year run. The only original member who remained in the band through its lifespan was guitarist Kevin Hanson. Woe, Is Me officially broke up in September 2013. They announced their reunion in July of 2022 with the Vengeance lineup and played their first show in over 9 years in Dallas, Texas on October 29th, 2022.

History

Formation and Numbers (2009–2010)
Woe, Is Me was founded during the fall of 2009 in Atlanta by former Of Machines drummer Austin Thornton, who started the band along with Kevin Hanson, Cory Ferris, and Ben Ferris, who were all formerly of a local Atlanta-based band named Cheyne Stokes. Tim Sherrill, who played lead guitar of another local group named Shooter McGavin, also joined in.

These five members then recruited Michael Bohn of A Path Less Traveled and Hance Alligood of Oh, Manhattan as the band's initial vocalists. Alligood stepped down shortly after and Matt Mulkey took his place as the band's clean vocalist. Whilst in the band, Mulkey helped write lyrics and record vocals for their original three demos, "Hell, or High Water", "I" and "If Not, for Ourselves", with producer Cameron Mizell before leaving. Tyler Carter, who was also a member of A Path Less Traveled along with Bohn, then became the band's clean vocalist.

With this seven-member line up, the band released these three demo tracks to their MySpace profile.

The group later recorded and released a cover of the Kesha song "Tik Tok", also showcased online within a few months of being a band. Soon after these recordings were released, The Artery Foundation took notice of them. Rise Records, along with their imprint label, Velocity Records, signed Woe, Is Me before even playing their first show. They recorded their debut album, Number[s] during the same month that they were signed. It was subsequently released on August 31, 2010. It reached position No. 16 on Billboards Top Heatseekers chart. The band's debut tour, the Pyknic Partery tour, was shared with Drop Dead, Gorgeous, From First to Last, Sleeping with Sirens, Abandon All Ships, For All Those Sleeping, and Attila.

Clean vocalist Tyler Carter's soul-influenced voice garnered comparisons to Jonny Craig, who provides guest appearances on the album. The group held an album release show in Georgia for Number[s] on September 2, 2010, with pop punk band Veara as a supporting act. Later in September, the band recorded a cover of the Katy Perry song "Hot n Cold" for the compilation album, Punk Goes Pop 3.

In an interview with radio station The Gunz Show, Carter stated that the band would be recording a music video for "[&] Delinquents" in September 2010. The group embarked on a Canadian tour supporting Abandon All Ships from October 1, 2010, to the 28th of that month. From November 4, 2010, to November 28, 2010, the band was included on a US tour entitled Average Guys with Exceptional Hair Tour in support of A Skylit Drive, along with For All Those Sleeping, Scarlett O'Hara, and Motionless in White. The music video for "[&] Delinquents" was released on the first of December of that year.

"Fame > Demise", lineup instability (2010–11)
By the end of 2010, lead guitarist Tim Sherrill parted ways with Woe, Is Me. Jack Langdell filled in until Geoffrey Higgins took up the position in March 2011. Soon after, the group officially released "Fame > Demise" (pronounced fame over demise) through the iTunes Store on March 21, 2011. Carter explained that the song is and would only remain as a single, and would not be part of the band's second album. An acoustic version of the song was also released.

In May 2011, new lead guitarist Geoffrey Higgins departed from the band. The group began their performances on Warped Tour with only Hanson performing the rhythm guitar parts to where leads were backtracked during performances for the time being due to their lack of a lead guitarist. With the band yet again searching for a lead guitar player, the conclusion of their search was made weeks afterward in Mid-July when Abandon All Ships' drummer and guitarist, Dan and Andrew Paiano, were kicked from the band. Almost immediately afterward, it was announced that Andrew would be joining Woe, Is Me to play lead guitar. 
On August 10, 2011, clean vocalist, Tyler Carter left the band. He cited an interest in following newer and different objectives than being in a band and went on to state that "[the rock 'n' roll lifestyle] and what it consists of just isn't for me anymore" as the reason for his departure.

"Vengeance", Number[s] re-issue, and Genesi[s] (2011–2012)
On September 15, 2011, Woe, Is Me announced via-video update the return of the band's original clean vocalist, Hance Alligood. Along with this update, the group also played various clips from a new single entitled, "Vengeance", which was released on September 27. On March 7, 2012, Michael Bohn and both Ferris brothers left the band due to personal, professional, and musical differences

"It came to a point where we could either continue on the path they saw fit, or we could create our own path and find happiness in our own ways," said Bohn and the Ferris brothers in a statement made shortly after their departure from the band. They have since reconciled with former bandmate, Tyler Carter, and created a new band named Issues with their friend, Case Snedecor.

On April 16, 2012, touring members Doriano Magliano (former vocalist for That's Outrageous!) and bassist Brian Medley officially announced they had joined Woe, Is Me. The band set to enter the studio throughout summer 2012 with a release set sometime later this year. On April 19, 2012, Woe, Is Me were announced as part of the "Scream It Like You Mean It 2012" tour (July–August 2012) alongside headliner Attack Attack! with We Came as Romans, The Acacia Strain, Oceano, Like Moths to Flames, Close to Home, Impending Doom, Abandon All Ships, Secrets, Volumes, For All Those Sleeping, The Chariot, Glass Cloud, At The Skylines, Texas in July, In Fear and Faith, and Hands Like Houses.

American Dream EP and breakup (2013)
On March 8, 2013, the band released a statement that they had parted ways with drummer and founding member Austin Thornton, due to personal differences. David Angle from At The Skylines was pulled in as his replacement. As of Thornton's departure, Kevin Hanson was the only original member in the band. With the release of the statement, the band also stated that they are planning on releasing a new single in June. On April 25, Woe, Is Me stated on their Facebook page that they will be tracking  their new music with Tom Denney. They plan to release it during the summer. A recent interview with the band and lead singer Hance in particular gave insight towards the feel of the new album that they are working on. "The singing/screaming ratio is more balanced, whereas Genesis had a lot more screaming and heavy parts. Doriano and I will share vocal responsibilities and have equal singing/screaming parts. Genesis had lots of breakdowns/chug parts, which don’t get me wrong, were cool. But, the heavy parts on this new stuff will be more riffy and more fun to move to. The choruses will still have the same pop feel to them as the ones from Genesi[s]".

On June 15, 2013, during the first show of Warped Tour, Woe, Is Me announced they would be releasing a new EP later in the year.  They later released a new song called "Stand Up," which was announced as the first single from the EP, titled American Dream. It is the first record to not have the Woe, Is Me symbol [s]. Before the new EP dropped, Andrew Paiano had an emergency forcing him to leave in late July and the group continued playing Warped Tour as a 5-piece.

While the band had a plan to record a third album, Alternative Press confirmed during September 2013 that the band had ended. Woe, Is Me included a personal post from vocalist Hance Alligood stating that he had "lost passion" for the genre and had decided to leave the band on good terms. As a result, the remaining members decided to disband instead of going through yet another lineup change.

Reunion (2022)

On July 25, 2022, a video hinting at a reunion was posted to the band's official Instagram page, with Michael Bohn, Hance Alligood, Andrew Paiano, Kevin Hanson, Austin Thornton, and both Ferris brothers all tagged in the post. This band lineup is the same as their single Vengeance. On July 29, they confirmed the reunion by announcing their first show back in Dallas, Texas for the Monster Mosh Festival.  Soon after, they also announced their first hometown show in Atlanta, Georgia since their comeback which took place on November 6, 2022.  Various members of the band on twitter and instagram have mentioned that they will be releasing new music in 2023.

Members 

Current members
Kevin Hanson – lead guitar , rhythm guitar 
Hance Alligood – clean vocals 
Michael Bohn – unclean vocals 
Andrew Paiano – rhythm guitar 
Ben Ferris – keyboards, unclean vocals 
Cory Ferris – bass guitar 
Austin Thornton – drums, programming 

Former members
Tim Sherrill – lead guitar 
Jack Langdell – lead guitar 
Geoffrey Higgins – lead guitar 
Matt Mulkey - clean vocals 
Tyler Carter – clean vocals 
Doriano Magliano – unclean vocals 
Brian Medley – bass guitar , rhythm guitar 
David Angle – drums 

Timeline

Discography

Studio albums

Extended plays

Singles

Music videos
"[&] Delinquents" (2010)
"Vengeance" (2011)
"A Story to Tell" (2013)

References

External links

Rise Records artists
Musical groups established in 2009
2009 establishments in Georgia (U.S. state)
Musical groups from Atlanta
Metalcore musical groups from Georgia (U.S. state)
Heavy metal musical groups from Georgia (U.S. state)
Musical groups disestablished in 2013
Musical groups reestablished in 2022